Fort Montluc, also known as Fort de Villeurbanne, is a fort located in the 3rd arrondissement of Lyon. The fort was built in 1831 as part of the Ceintures de Lyon, which were a series of fortifications surrounding Lyon. It is currently used as a metropolitan police station.

History 

Fort Montluc was built between 1831 and 1835 and was part of a system of fortifications to protect Lyon from possible enemy attack. The interior included a large two-storey cavalier which, could hold 600 soldiers. The fort later served as a garrison.

Present day 
At the end of the 19th century, the glacis surrounding the fort were occupied by French military, and have since been replaced by a garden square. The fort was owned by the Minister of the Interior from 1969 to 2007, after which it has been used as a metropolitan police station.

See also 
 Montluc prison

References

External links 

 Lyon Military Museum article about the fort 

1830s establishments in France
3rd arrondissement of Lyon
Montluc